Government Sanskrit College, Thiruvananthapuram, is one of the oldest undergraduate and postgraduate, coeducational college located in Thiruvananthapuram, Kerala. It was established in the year 1889. The college is affiliated with Kerala University. This college offers different courses in Sanskrit literature.

Accreditation
The college is  recognized by the University Grants Commission (UGC).

References

External links

Educational institutions established in 1889
1889 establishments in India
Colleges affiliated to the University of Kerala
Colleges in Thiruvananthapuram
Arts and Science colleges in Kerala